Jis Joy is an Indian dubbing artist, film writer, director, and lyricist who works in the Malayalam film industry. He made his directorial debut with the Malayalam film Bicycle Thieves.

Career
Jis Joy started his film career as a dubbing artist who has dubbed for Telugu actor Allu Arjun for Malayalam versions and Prithviraj’s dubbed films. Later, he went on to work as Director and scriptwriter for various advertisements.

Filmography

As a director

As a lyricist

As a dubbing artist

Recurring collaborators

References

External links
 

Malayalam film directors
Malayali people
Living people
Year of birth missing (living people)
21st-century Indian film directors